Bosara agassizi is a moth in the family Geometridae which is endemic to Papua New Guinea.

References

Moths described in 2002
Endemic fauna of Papua New Guinea
Eupitheciini